The Microregion of Votuporanga is located on the northwest of São Paulo state, Brazil, and is made up of 9 municipalities. It belongs to the Mesoregion of São José do Rio Preto.

The microregion has a population of 139,475 inhabitants, in an area of 3,208.7 km²

Municipalities 
The microregion consists of the following municipalities, listed below with their 2010 Census populations (IBGE/2010):

Álvares Florence:  3,897
Américo de Campos: 5,706
Cardoso:  12,805
Cosmorama: 7,214
Parisi: 2,132
Pontes Gestal: 3,518
Riolândia: 12,575
Valentim Gentil: 17,036
Votuporanga:104,692

References

Votuporanga